Conway County is a county located in the U.S. state of Arkansas. Created as Arkansas's 11th county on October 20, 1825, Conway County has four incorporated municipalities, including Morrilton, the county seat and most populous city. The county is also the site of numerous unincorporated communities and ghost towns. The county is named for Henry Wharton Conway, a politician from a powerful political family who served as the delegate from the Arkansas Territory to the U.S. Congress from 1823 to 1827.

As of the 2020 census, the population was 20,715. The county seat is Morrilton. The county was formed on October 20, 1825, from a portion of Pulaski County and named for Henry Wharton Conway who was the territorial delegate to the U.S. Congress.

In 2010, the center of population of Arkansas was located in Conway County, near the city of Plumerville.

History

Conway County was formed on October 20, 1825, from a portion of Pulaski County and named for Henry Wharton Conway, who was the territorial delegate to the U.S. Congress.

From 1831 until 1883, Lewisburg was the county seat. People relocated from Lewisburg to Morrilton beginning in 1880, county government was relocated in 1883, and the depot was built in 1910.

Conway County was much larger upon creation. Van Buren County was created from parts of Conway, Izard, and Independence counties on November 11, 1833. Perry County was created from Conway County on December 18, 1840. Faulkner County was created from parts of Conway and Pulaski counties on April 12, 1873.

Geography

Conway County is within the Arkansas River Valley region, a fertile, low-lying valley along the Arkansas River between the Ozark Mountains to the north and the Ouachita Mountains to the south.

It is the fifth-smallest county in Arkansas by area.

Conway County is surrounded by two Central Arkansas counties: Faulkner County to the east and Perry County to the south, and three River Valley/mountain counties: Van Buren County to the north, Yell County to the southwest, and Pope County to the west.

Hydrology

Protected areas
The northern  of Conway County is protected within the Ozark National Forest, a small part of a large protected forest spanning parts of 16 Arkansas counties. Petit Jean State Park, is Arkansas's oldest state park, rises from the River Valley in southern Conway County along the top of Petit Jean Mountain.

Conway County is home to five Wildlife Management Areas (WMAs) under Arkansas Game and Fish Commission jurisdiction. Ed Gordon Point Remove WMA is a wetland near the confluence of the East Fork and West Fork of Point Remove Creek in western Conway County. The area is known for duck, deer, and dove hunting. Lake Overcup WMA is a noted crappie fishing lake created by AGFC in 1963. Cypress Creek WMA is located around the shore of Brewer Lake, a fishing lake built in 1983 to construct a water supply for Conway, as well as containing parts of the Cherokee WMA and a small part of Piney Creeks WMA. The county is also home to the Cove Creek Natural Area.

Demographics

2020 Census

As of the 2020 United States census, there were 20,715 people, 8,309 households, and 5,600 families residing in the county.

2010 Census

As of the 2010 census, there were 21,273 people, 8,463 households, and 4,473 families in the county. The population density was 38 people per square mile (14/km2).  There were 9,720 housing units at an average density of 17 per square mile (7/km2). The racial makeup of the county was 84.2% White, 11.2% Black or African American, 0.7% Native American, 0.4% Asian, 0.0% Pacific Islander, 1.5% from other races, and 2.0% from two or more races. 3.6% of the population were Hispanic or Latino of any race.

Of the 8,463 households 28.0% had children under the age of 18 living with them, 52.9% were married couples living together, 11.8% had a female householder with no husband present, and 30.4% were non-families. 26.4% of households were one person and 11.6% were one person aged 65 or older. The average household size was 2.48 and the average family size was 2.98.

The age distribution was 24.2% under the age of 18, 7.9% from 18 to 24, 23.4% from 25 to 44, 27.7% from 45 to 64, and 16.9% 65 or older. The median age was 40.5 years. For every 100 females there were 98.1 males. For every 100 females age 18 and over, there were 95.1 males.

The median household income was $32,700 and the median family income  was $48,116. Males had a median income of $38,675 versus $26,318 for females. The per capita income for the county was $19,909. About 10.2% of families and 17.0% of the population were below the poverty line, including 19.8% of those under age 18 and 14.5% of those age 65 or over.

2000 Census

At the 2000 census, there were 20,336 people, 7,967 households, and 5,736 families in the county.  The population density was 37 people per square mile (14/km2).  There were 9,028 housing units at an average density of 16 per square mile (6/km2).  The racial makeup of the county was 84.27% White, 13.05% Black or African American, 0.50% Native American, 0.23% Asian, 0.03% Pacific Islander, 0.74% from other races, and 1.18% from two or more races.  1.77% of the population were Hispanic or Latino of any race.

Of the 7,967 households 31.40% had children under the age of 18 living with them, 56.70% were married couples living together, 11.50% had a female householder with no husband present, and 28.00% were non-families. 25.40% of households were one person and 12.10% were one person aged 65 or older.  The average household size was 2.51 and the average family size was 2.99.

The age distribution was 25.40% under the age of 18, 8.30% from 18 to 24, 26.70% from 25 to 44, 23.50% from 45 to 64, and 16.10% 65 or older.  The median age was 38 years. For every 100 females there were 94.40 males.  For every 100 females age 18 and over, there were 91.50 males.

The median household income was $31,209 and the median family income  was $38,179. Males had a median income of $28,199 versus $20,134 for females. The per capita income for the county was $16,056.  About 12.20% of families and 16.10% of the population were below the poverty line, including 21.90% of those under age 18 and 13.10% of those age 65 or over.

Government
Prior to 2000, the county was reliably Democratic, voting solidly for the party in every presidential election except the 1972 and 1984 landslides of Richard Nixon and Ronald Reagan, respectively. Former Governor Bill Clinton won this county twice in his 1992 and 1996 presidential runs.

As is the case with most rural counties since the turn of the millennium, the county has turned sharply rightward and away from a more socially liberal Democratic Party than the one Clinton led. Donald Trump won a record 61% of the vote in 2016 over former Arkansas First Lady and U.S. First Lady Hillary Clinton, owing both to the strength of Trump in rural America and the decline of the Clinton brand in their home state. In 2020, Trump won an even larger share of more than 65% of the vote over Democrat Joe Biden (despite Biden winning the national election), which once again marked the highest vote share for a Republican in the county in history.

The Democratic Party continued to win all local county and city elected offices until 2018, when two members of the Republican Party were elected: Keith Long as Justice of the Peace and Dennis Decker as County Coroner. 

In the 2022 midterm elections, the county government flipped red, with Republicans winning all but three contested seats. Additionally, four Republicans were newly elected as new justices of the peace, the party flipped three Morrilton City Council seats – including Isaac Decker, who became the youngest to ever be elected, at age 20 – and the Oppelo Mayoral race.

Communities

Cities
 Morrilton (county seat)
 Oppelo
 Plumerville

Town
 Menifee

Census-designated places
 Center Ridge
 Hattieville
 Jerusalem
 Springfield

Other unincorporated communities
 Blackwell
 Cleveland
 Formosa
 Jerusalem
 Lanty
 Mount Olive
 Pleasant Hill
 Pontoon
 Solgohachia
 Winrock

Townships

 Austin
 Bentley (Oppelo)
 Bird
 Catholic Point
 Cedar Falls
 Gregory
 Griffin
 Higgins
 Howard (Menifee, Plumerville)
 Lick Mountain (CDP Center Ridge)
 Martin
 McLaren
 Nichols
 Old Hickory
 Petit Jean
 St. Vincent
 Steele
 Union
 Washington
 Welborn (Morrilton)
 White Eagle

Infrastructure

Major highways
 I-40
 US Highway 64

See also
 David J. Sanders, state senator who represents Conway County
 National Register of Historic Places listings in Conway County, Arkansas
 "Wolverton Mountain", country song based on a story from Woolverton Mountain in Conway County

Notes

References

External links
 10th Arkansas Infantry, Local Regiment During the Civil War
 Conway County Sheriff's Office

 
1825 establishments in Arkansas Territory
Populated places established in 1825